The Nasdaq Tallinn AS, formerly known as the Tallinn Stock Exchange, is a stock exchange operating in Tallinn, Estonia. Nasdaq Tallinn is the only regulated secondary securities market in Estonia. The major stock market index is Nasdaq Tallinn, formerly known as TALSE.

History 

The foundation of Estonian Central Securities Depository in 1994 created the basis for the development of the secondary market based on electronic trading system. This was realized with the founding of the Tallinn Stock Exchange in April 1995 by 10 commercial banks, 9 brokerage firms and state players (Hüvitusfond, Bank of Estonia, and Ministry of Finance), equal holding of each of them. Licensed by the Ministry of Finance, Tallinn Stock Exchange opened for trading on May 31, 1996 with 11 securities listed.

June 3 was the first calculation day for the TALSE index.

In 1999 September 24, The alliance of Nordic Exchanges (NOREX) formally invited Tallinn Stock Exchange, alongside Riga Stock Exchange and the National Stock Exchange of Lithuania, to start negotiations for the potential merger with the union.

In 2001 May 28, the Baltic exchanges and the NOREX officially announced that they suspended further cooperation.

In 2000 October, Tallinn Stock Exchange and Estonian CSD formed, based on the two companies, a group under single strategic management.

In 2001 April, HEX Group from Finland acquired strategic ownership in the Tallinn Stock Exchange Group. Trading in Estonian securities in the HEX trading system started on February 25, 2002.

In 2003 September 4, The first day of operations for OMHEX, the new parent company of HEX Tallinn, created by the merger of Swedish OM and Finnish HEX.

In 2004, as a result of merger between Finnish and Swedish securities market operators into OMX, the Tallinn Stock Exchange adopted new trading platform.

In 2007, the alternative market “First North” was launched.

In 2008, NASDAQ and OMX merged; NASDAQ OMX Group, Inc. was formed. OMX Tallinn became NASDAQ OMX Tallinn.

In 2014, NASDAQ OMX Group, Inc. changed its business name to Nasdaq, Inc. NASDAQ OMX Tallinn became Nasdaq Tallinn.

Tradable securities

Main list 
As of August 2022, there were 18 companies listed on the main list of Nasdaq Tallinn:

 Arco Vara (ARC1T)
 Baltika (BLT1T)
 Coop Pank (CPA1T)
 EfTEN Real Estate Fund III (EFT1T)
 Ekspress Grupp (EEG1T)
 Enefit Green (EGR1T)
 Harju Elekter (HAE1T)
 Hepsor (HPR1T)
 LHV Group (LHV1T)
 Merko Ehitus (MRK1T; previously MKO1T)
 Nordecon (NCN1T; previously Eesti Ehitus)
 PRFoods (PRF1T)
 Pro Kapital Grupp (PKG1T)
 Silvano Fashion Group (SFGAT; previously PTA Grupp, PTAAT)
 Tallink Grupp (TAL1T)
 Tallinna Kaubamaja Grupp (TKM1T)
 Tallinna Sadam (TSM1T)
 Tallinna Vesi (TVEAT)

Secondary List 
As of August 2022, there were two companies listed on the Secondary List of Nasdaq Tallinn:

 Nordic Fibreboard (SKN1T)
 Trigon Property Development (TPD1T)

Bond List 
As of 2019 May, there were 7 corporate bond issues listed on the Bond List of Nasdaq Tallinn:

 Admiral Markets 8% subord. bond
 Baltic Horizon Fund 4.25% bond
 Inbank 7.00% subord. bond
 LHV Group 7.25% subord. bond
 LHV Group 6.50% subord. bond
 LHV Group 6.00% subord. bond
 UPP Olaines 7.00% subord. bond

Fund List 
As of 2019 May, there were the units of one investment fund listed on Nasdaq Tallinn Fund List:

 Baltic Horizon Fund

Nasdaq First North 
As of August 2022, the securities of 12 companies were being traded on Nasdaq Tallinn First North market:

 Airbot Technologies (AIR)
 Bercman Technologies (BERCM)
 Cleveron Mobility (CLEV)
 Estonian Japan Trading Company (EJTC)
 ELMO Rent (ELMO)
 Hagen Bikes (HAGEN)
 Linda Nektar (LINDA)
 MADARA Cosmetics (MDARA)
 Modera (MODE)
 Punktid Technologies (PNKTD)
 Robus Group (ROBUS)
 Saunum Group (SAUNA)

Trading Day

Formerly listed companies 
 Eesti Telekom (ETLAT)
 Eesti Ühispank
 Estiko
 Hansapank
 Kalev (KLV1T), later Luterma AS
 Norma (NRM1T)
 Olympic Entertainment Group (OEG1T)
 Saku Õlletehas (SKU1T)
 AS Starman (SMN1T)
 Tallinna Farmaatsiatehas (TFA1T)

See also
List of stock exchanges
List of European stock exchanges
Nasdaq Copenhagen
Nasdaq Stockholm
Nasdaq Helsinki
Nasdaq Vilnius
Nasdaq Riga
Nasdaq Iceland

References

External links 
Official website
Nasdaq Baltic Index

Financial services companies established in 1996
Economy of Estonia
Stock exchanges in Europe
Tallinn
Nasdaq Nordic
Economy of Tallinn